Duh Maw-sheng (born 1 May 1973) is a Taiwanese bobsledder. He competed in the four man event at the 1998 Winter Olympics.

References

1973 births
Living people
Taiwanese male bobsledders
Olympic bobsledders of Taiwan
Bobsledders at the 1998 Winter Olympics
Place of birth missing (living people)
20th-century Taiwanese people